The 2011 Tajik League was the 20th season of Tajik League, the Tajikistan Football Federation's top division of association football. Istiklol retained the Championship they won the previous season.

Teams

League standings

References

External links
 RSSSF 2011

Tajikistan Higher League seasons
1
Tajik
Tajik